Aghnahily Ringfort is a ringfort (rath) and National Monument located in County Laois, Ireland.

Location

References

Archaeological sites in County Laois
National Monuments in County Laois